The CableTelevision Advertising Bureau (CAB) is an organization of national and local ad-supported cable TV networks in the United States.

References

External links 
 thecab.tv

Advertising trade associations
Advertising in the United States
Television networks in the United States